Events from the year 1524 in art.

Events
 Marcantonio Raimondi publishes the first set of his erotic engravings I Modi in Rome (perhaps based on paintings by Giulio Romano), which will be suppressed (and Raimondi briefly imprisoned) by order of Pope Clement VII.

Paintings

 Giovanni Francesco Bembo paints an altarpiece for San Pietro depicting a Madonna with three saints and a donor
 Hans Holbein the Younger paints Venus and Amor
 Giovanni Antonio Lappoli executed some frescoes for Visitation for Badia di Sante Fiore e Lucilla and Adoration of the Magi for the church of San Francisco
 Parmigianino paints a portrait of Gian Galeazzo Sanvitale, Count of Fontanellato
 Jan Provoost paints The Virgin in Glory at about this date, now in the Hermitage Museum
 Francesco Vecellio completes an altarpiece for San Vito in Cadore

Births
date unknown
Giovanni Battista Fontana, Italian painter and engraver (died 1587)
Hans Sebald Lautensack, German painter and etcher (died 1560)
Plautilla Nelli, Florentine religious painter and nun (died 1588)
Cipriano Piccolpasso, Italian painter of majolica (died 1579)
Willem Thibaut, Dutch Golden Age painter (died 1597)
probable 
Paolo Farinati, Italian painter of the Mannerist style (died 1606)
Petruccio Ubaldini, Italian calligraphist and illuminator on vellum (died 1600)

Deaths
October 5 - Joachim Patinir, Flemish Northern Renaissance history and landscape painter (born 1480)
date unknown
Girolamo Alibrandi, Italian painter (born 1470)
Vasco de la Zarza, Spanish Renaissance sculptor (born unknown)
Hans Holbein the Elder, German painter (born 1460)
Tommaso Malvito, Italian sculptor (born unknown)
Andrea Solari, Italian Renaissance painter (born 1460)
Tang Yin, Chinese scholar, painter of the Ming dynasty (born 1470)

 
Years of the 16th century in art